Mark Meadows (born 1959) is the former U.S. representative for North Carolina's 11th congressional district and the former White House chief of staff.

Mark Meadows may also refer to:

 Mark Stephen Meadows, American artist, author, and engineer
 Mark Meadows (Michigan politician) (born 1947), mayor of East Lansing, Michigan, former Michigan legislator, attorney
 Mark Meadows (actor), British actor